Stefano Vavoli (born 30 December 1960 in Terracina, Italy) is an Italian retired footballer. He played as a goalkeeper. He played for Genoa youth teams and he made his debut in Serie B during 1979-1980 season. He continued his career in lower series with Pergocrema, Civitavecchia, Entella, Sant'Elena Quartu and Sorso until 1986. During that year he was bought by Verona with whom he played one season in Serie A as the reserve of Giuliano Giuliani. He made his Serie A debut on 12 October 1986 against Udinese and played also another match against Avellino the subsequent week. He then returned to play in Serie C with Massese and some other teams.

Vavoli is one of four footballers born in Terracina to play in Serie A.

References

External links
Web Archive

1960 births
Living people
Italian footballers
Serie A players
Serie B players
Hellas Verona F.C. players
Genoa C.F.C. players
Association football goalkeepers